Mahmoud el-Alamy served as President of the Fédération Nationale du Scoutisme Marocain.

In 1978, he was awarded the 131st Bronze Wolf, the only distinction of the World Organization of the Scout Movement, awarded by the World Scout Committee for exceptional services to world Scouting.

References

External links

Recipients of the Bronze Wolf Award
Scouting in Morocco
Possibly living people
Year of birth missing